Macbeth is a 1960 Australian TV film based on the play by William Shakespeare. It was directed by William Sterling.

The ABC would present another version of the play in 1965.

Cast
Ken Goodlet as Macbeth		
Keith Eden as Macduff		
Christine Hill
Douglas Kelly as Duncan
Mark Kelly		
Rod Milgate as Malcolm
Wynn Roberts as Banquo		
Dinah Shearing as Lady Macbeth

Production
The play was filmed in conjunction with The Life and Death of Richard II which was shot in Sydney. Macbeth had several months of planning and rehearsals.  Nine sets were used. There was location filming at Beaconsfield and  Cape Schank (for the witches scene). It was set in the eleventh century and was described as akin to Orson Welles' 1948 film production of the play.

Barry Creyton has a small role. "I literally carried a spear," he later said.

Reception
The Sydney Morning Herald wrote that the production as "visually efficient" but also "a dreadful warning of what can happen when a producer becomes frightened of a great text... a torrent of gabble and shouting. Some of the most concise dramatic poetry in all Shakespeare received treatment worthy of the race results."

The Age said it was an "inordinately successful presentation." In its year review of drama, that paper said it was one of the "outstanding" productions of the year.

References

External links

Australian television plays
Films based on Macbeth
1960 television plays
Films directed by William Sterling (director)
1960s English-language films